Dallas Township is a civil township of Clinton County in the U.S. state of Michigan. The population was 2,369 at the 2010 census.  The township was established in 1845 from a section of Lebanon Township and named for vice president George M. Dallas.

Communities
 The village of Fowler is located within the township on M-21.

Geography

Dallas Township is located in western Clinton County and is bordered by Ionia County to the west.

Demographics
As of the census of 2000, there were 2,323 people, 781 households, and 606 families residing in the township. There were 804 housing units at an average density of 22.0 per square mile (8.5/km2). The racial makeup of the township was 99.31% White, 0.13% Native American, 0.22% Asian, 0.13% from other races, and 0.22% from two or more races. Hispanic or Latino of any race were 1.12% of the population.

There were 781 households, out of which 40.2% had children under the age of 18 living with them, 69.9% were married couples living together, 5.5% had a female householder with no husband present, and 22.3% were non-families. 18.8% of all households were made up of individuals, and 8.8% had someone living alone who was 65 years of age or older.  The average household size was 2.97 and the average family size was 3.46.

In the township the population was spread out, with 31.0% under the age of 18, 9.9% from 18 to 24, 27.3% from 25 to 44, 20.4% from 45 to 64, and 11.3% who were 65 years of age or older.  The median age was 33 years. For every 100 females, there were 107.8 males.  For every 100 females age 18 and over, there were 103.3 males.

The median income for a household in the township was $50,156, and the median income for a family was $60,417. Males had a median income of $40,194 versus $27,008 for females. The per capita income for the township was $18,085.  About 2.4% of families and 3.3% of the population were below the poverty line, including 3.1% of those under age 18 and 4.6% of those age 65 or over.

References

External links

Townships in Michigan
Townships in Clinton County, Michigan
Lansing–East Lansing metropolitan area
Populated places established in 1845
1845 establishments in Michigan